Shortly before midnight on March 13, 2022, it was announced that a lone gunman had shot three homeless men in Washington D.C. between March 3 and March 9, wounding two and killing one. He then shot two additional homeless men in New York City on March 12, wounding one and killing the other. The fatal shooting in New York City, caught on tape, shows a man inspecting a homeless man sleeping on a sleeping bag on a sidewalk cornering a building or outpost, then pointing a gun towards the man's upper body, and opening fire.

On March 15, a 30-year-old resident of Washington, D.C., was arrested in connection with the attacks. Authorities suspect that the attacks could possibly have targeted homeless individuals, although it has not yet been officially ruled as the main motive by any authority figures, nor were any hate crime charges filed.

Attacks 
One man was shot on March 3 at around 4:00 am and another shot on March 8 around 1:20 am, with both injuries occurring in Northeast Washington, D.C., and being described as non-threatening injuries. On March 9, an officer responding to a tent fire discovered a man dead inside due to multiple gunshot and stab wounds. The man was later identified as 54-year-old Morgan Holmes.

Then, on March 12, a man was shot in the arm in New York City while asleep at about 4:30 am, the victim woke up and screamed at the perpetrator "What are you doing?" before the perpetrator fled the scene. Later another man was found dead with gunshot wounds to his head and neck, with video footage of the attack showing the perpetrator approaching the victim and kicking him several times before opening fire. Gunfire was reported by witnesses around 6 a.m. The victim was identified as Gambian native Abdoulaye Coulibaly.

Investigation 
Police initially connected the killings after a Metropolitan Police Captain from Queens recognized the man's photo from an investigation in Washington. Federal investigators from the ATF compared the shell casings and confirmed they were similar.

Both the New York City Mayor Eric Adams and Washington D.C. Mayor Muriel Bowser announced that they were coordinating with federal authorities to fully investigate the crimes. The New York City Police Department (NYPD) and Washington's Metropolitan Police Department (MPD) announced on March 13 that they were opening a joint investigation into the shootings, along with the Bureau of Alcohol, Tobacco, Firearms and Explosives (ATF). Authorities have offered a number of rewards for information resulting in an arrest; MPD offered a reward of $25,000, NYPD offered a reward of $10,000, and the ATF Washington Field Division offered $20,000.

Police in Washington D.C. released a video of the suspected perpetrator and passed out flyers around the area of the shootings and Mayor Bowser announced to reporters that the shootings were connected, due to ballistic evidence.

On March 15, 2022, ATF investigators in Washington, D.C., arrested a 30-year-old male suspect in connection with the shootings. Police say they had earlier received a tip from someone who recognized the suspect.

Response 
Adams and Bowser released a joint statement calling the shootings "heartbreaking and tragic" and the perpetrator a "cold-blooded killer". NYPD Police Commissioner Keechant Sewell noted the vulnerability of the homeless population and that the police would use any tool and method available to arrest the perpetrator.

Adams announced a task force to help identify homeless individuals in subways and other locations and provide information and safe locations at city shelters. However, many of the homeless population refused to enter shelters claiming that the shelters offered were unsafe and unsanitary due to lack of resources provided towards upkeep and other homeless individuals.

References 

2022 in New York City
2022 in Washington, D.C.
Crime in New York City
Crime in Washington, D.C.
Discrimination against the homeless
March 2022 crimes in the United States
Homelessness in the United States